Boris Valentinovich Lavrov (born June 15, 1950) is a Russian-Uzbekistani football coach. He was also a former player, appearing for Stoitel Ashkhabad in 1969.

External links
  Career summary at KLISF

1950 births
Living people
Sportspeople from Tashkent
Soviet footballers
Soviet football managers
Uzbekistani footballers
Uzbekistani football managers
Russian football managers
FK Köpetdag Aşgabat managers
Association football defenders
FK Köpetdag Aşgabat players